Arthur Sunday  (born August Wacher; January 21, 1862 – August 26, 1926), was a Major League Baseball player who played outfielder for the Brooklyn Ward's Wonders of the Players' League in 1890.

Sunday died in 1926 after suffering burns from a fire while working for a fire patrol.

References

External links

1862 births
1926 deaths
Major League Baseball outfielders
Baseball players from Illinois
Brooklyn Ward's Wonders players
19th-century baseball players
St. Joseph Reds players
Wichita Braves players
Dallas Hams players
Fort Worth Panthers players
Toledo Black Pirates players
Houston Mud Cats players
Sacramento Senators players
Birmingham Grays players
Kansas City Cowboys (minor league) players
Stockton River Pirates players
Los Angeles Angels (minor league) players
Deaths from fire in the United States
Accidental deaths in Nevada